Riverburn is a 2004 short film directed by Jennifer Calvert, that won her Best Young Canadian Director of a Short Film at the 2004 Vancouver International Film Festival.

The 20 minute film—inspired by Andrei Tarkovsky and Terrence Malick—is about a city girl (Magda Apanowicz) who while briefly left alone on a camping trip, meets a city boy, sparking a mutual interest.

Jason Whyte included the short in his Top 5 list for the Vancouver festival.

The short was shot in British Columbia in the summer of 2003.

References

Canadian drama short films
2004 films
English-language Canadian films
2000s English-language films
2000s Canadian films